Stars and the Sea is the second and final album by Boy Kill Boy. It was released on 31 March 2008. It was recorded in three recording studios in Cornwall, Brighton, and Los Angeles. The track, "Loud and Clear", was made available for a free download from the band's website.

Much deliberation was made over the name of the album. In the December 2007 edition of Uncut, the magazine claimed that it would be a self-titled album, also HMV had the title listed as Loud and Clear, although MTV2UK and Amazon had both named it Stars and the Sea. It was finally announced in early November 2007 that it would be called this.

It charted at number 98 on 6 April 2008. The relatively poor sales of the record and subsequent label issues have been claimed to be behind the split of the band later in 2008.

Production
Recording took place at Sunset Sound and Hillside Manor, with producer Dave Sardy. Ryan Castle served as the main engineer, with Cameron Barton as secondary engineer at Hillside Manor, and Clifton Allen as secondary engineer at Sunset Sound. Andy Brohard did Pro Tools editing and additional engineering, while Greg Gordon did additional editing. Sardy mixed the recordings, before the album was mastered by Stephen Marcussen at Marcussen Mastering.

Track listing
All songs and lyrics by Chris Peck. All arrangements by Boy Kill Boy.

"Promises" – 3:30
"No Conversation" – 3:59
"Be Somebody" – 3:26
"Loud + Clear" – 3:39
"Paris" – 3:52
"A-OK" – 4:13
"Ready to Go" – 4:12
"Rosie's on Fire" – 3:33
"Kidda – Kidda" – 4:40
"Pen 'n Ink" – 3:18
"Two Souls" – 4:38

Personnel
Personnel per booklet.

Boy Kill Boy
 Chris Peck – vocals, guitar
 Shaz Mahmood – drums
 Kevin Chase – bass
 Peter Carr – keyboards

Production and design
 Dave Sardy – producer, mixing
 Ryan Castle – engineer
 Andy Brohard – Pro Tools editing, additional engineer
 Cameron Barton – second engineer
 Clifton Allen – second engineer
 Greg Gordon – additional editing
 Stephen Marcussen – mastering
 Intro – design
 Victoria Smith – band photography

References

2008 albums
Boy Kill Boy albums
Albums produced by Dave Sardy
Vertigo Records albums